Hadley Football Club is a football club based in Arkley, Barnet, England.

History
The club was founded in 1882, and started playing in the North Middlesex League. They joined the Barnet & District League in 1922, which they played in until transferring to the North Suburban League in 1957. In 1970 the club switched to the Mid-Herts League, going on to win back-to-back Premier Division titles in 1975–76 and 1976–77 and the Premier Division Shield in 1976–77.

In 1977 Hadley joined Division Three of the Hertfordshire Senior County League. They won the division at the first attempt, earning promotion to Division One rather than Division Two. The following season, 1978–79, saw them finish the season as Division One runners-up, resulting in promotion to the Premier Division. However, they were relegated back to Division One after finishing bottom of the Premier Division in 1983–84. At the end of the 1984–85 season the club left the league to join the Southern Olympian League. They rejoined Division One of the Hertfordshire Senior County League in 1999, and were promoted to the Premier Division after winning the Division One title in 2001–02. In 2003–04 they won the Premier Division and the Herts Senior Centenary Trophy. They retained the league title the following season and won the league's Aubrey Cup in 2005–06.

At the end of the 2006–07 season the club made an application to join the Spartan South Midlands league, this was blocked by the Herts County League, so the following season the club dropped out of the league and played in the West Herts Saturday League Premier Division, which they won at the first attempt. Another application was made to join the Spartan South Midlands League in 2008 and the club was accepted into Division Two. The 2008–09 season saw them finish the season as Division Two runners-up, earning promotion to Division One, as well as winning the Division Two Cup. They went on to finish second in Division One the following season and were promoted to the Premier Division. In 2015–16 they won the Herts Charity Shield, beating Tring Athletic 3–1 in the final. At the end of the 2018–19 season the club were transferred to the Essex Senior League. Two seasons later they were transferred back to the Premier Division of the Spartan South Midlands League.

In 2021–22 Hadley won the Spartan South Midlands League Challenge Tropgt, defeating Stotfold 3–1 in the final.

Ground
The club originally played on Hadley Common in Monken Hadley. Around 1947 the club moved to Wrotham Park, where they played until around 1955, when they moved to Barnet Playing Fields. They played at St Albans Road in Barnet during the 1977–78 season but had their lease terminated at the end of the season, so moved to Chandos Avenue in Whetstone, the England training base.

In 1985 the club moved to Woodside Park Club in Totteridge, before moving to Brickfield Lane in Arkley in 1992. At the start of the 2008–09 season the club started playing at Parkfield in Potters Bar, before returning to Brickfield Lane in 2016 following installation of new floodlights and a stand.

Honours
Spartan South Midlands League
Challenge Trophy winners 2021–22
Division Two Cup winners 2008–09
Hertfordshire Senior County League
Premier Division champions 2003–04, 2004–05
Division One champions 2001–02
Division Three champions 1977–78
Aubrey Cup winners 2005–06
Centenary Trophy winners 2003–04
Mid-Herts Football League
Premier Division champions 1975–76, 1976–77
Premier Division Shield winners 1976–77
West Herts Saturday League
Champions 2007–08
Herts Senior Centenary Trophy
Winners 2003–04
Herts Charity Shield
Winners 2015–16

Records
Best FA Cup performance: Third qualifying round, 2016–17, 2019-20
Best FA Vase performance: Fifth round, 2020–21

See also
Hadley F.C. players
Hadley F.C. managers

References

External links
Official website

 
Football clubs in England
Football clubs in London
Association football clubs established in 1882
Sport in the London Borough of Barnet
1882 establishments in England
Mid-Herts Football League
Hertfordshire Senior County League
Spartan South Midlands Football League
Essex Senior Football League